Apeplopoda improvisa is a moth of the family Erebidae. It was described by William Schaus in 1912. It found in Costa Rica.

References

Moths described in 1912
Euchromiina
Moths of Central America